Nikola Topić (born 10 August 2005) is a Serbian professional basketball player for OKK Beograd of the Basketball League of Serbia.

Early career 
Topić grew up playing basketball for KK Defense from his native Novi Sad from which he joined the Crvena zvezda youth system in June 2020.

Professional career 
On 28 March 2022, Topić made his professional debut for Crvena zvezda in an ABA League match against Slovenian side Krka at the age of 16. He scored 4 points and had 5 assists over 16 minutes of playing time. At 16 years, seven months, and eighteen days of age, he became the youngest player in club's history to score points for Crvena zvezda in the regional league. On 1 April, Topić made his EuroLeague debut in a 82–57 lost to Bayern Munich, becoming one of youngest players to ever play in the EuroLeague at 16 years and 253 days of age.

On 9 January 2023, the ABA League declined and cancelled the Topić's transfer to FMP Meridian. Eventually, he was loaned to OKK Beograd for the rest of the 2022–23 season.

National team career 
In August 2021, Topić was a member of the Serbian under-16 national team that participated at the FIBA U16 European Challengers in Novi Sad, Serbia. He played only one game, recording 17 points, 8 rebounds, and 5 assists in a 83–52 win over the Czech Republic.

Career statistics

Euroleague

|-
| style="text-align:left;"| 2021–22
| style="text-align:left;"| Crvena zvezda
| 1 || 0 || 2:17 || .000 || .000 || .000 || 0.0 || 0.0 || 0.0 || 0.0 || 0.0 || -1.0
|-
| style="text-align:left;"| 2022–23
| style="text-align:left;"| Crvena zvezda
| 2 || 0 || 4:03 || .000 || .000 || .000 || 1.0 || 0.5 || 0.0 || 0.0 || 0.0 || 0.0
|-
|- class="sortbottom"
| style="text-align:center;" colspan="2"| Career
| 3 || 0 || 3:27 || .000 || .000 || .000 || 0.7 || 0.3 || 0.0 || 0.0 || 0.0 || -0.3

Personal life 
Nikola is a son of Milenko Topić, a Serbian basketball coach and former player. A power forward, Milenko spent most of his career in the YUBA League playing for Profikolor, BFC Beočin, Crvena zvezda as well, Budućnost, and Hemofarm. In later career, Milenko played in Italy and Greece. Nikola's father also represented the Yugoslavian national team internationally (representing FR Yugoslavia), with whom he won gold medals at the EuroBasket 1997 and the 1998 FIBA World Championship, a silver medal at the 1996 Summer Olympics, and a bronze at the EuroBasket 1999.

See also
 List of father-and-son combinations who have played for Crvena zvezda
 List of youngest EuroLeague players

References

External links 
 Profile at euroleague.net
 Profile at ABA League
 Nikola Topic at realgm.com
 Nikola Topic at proballers.com

2005 births
Living people
ABA League players
Basketball players from Novi Sad
KK Crvena zvezda players
OKK Beograd players
Serbian men's basketball players
Point guards